The AC Mark VI (stylized as MK VI) is a sports car manufactured by British company AC Cars and an iteration of AC Cars' classic Ace and Cobra sports cars. This is the third veicle of the series to not feature the name "Cobra", due to the fact Ford Motor Company had trademarked the name.

The AC MK VI is the first version of the vehicle to be built in Germany (the MK V has been built in Malta), the first to use a V8 engine manufactured by GM (the AC 212 S/C had a Lotus engine), the first to be available in a coupé version that was not designed specifically for racing and the first version to feature gullwing doors in its coupé form.

The vehicle will be manufactured by former Gullwing GmbH in Heyda in Germany (eventually assembled by Hi-Tech Automotive in South Africa).

Introduction 
The MK VI was first introduced on April 16, 2009 at the Top Marques Car Show in Monaco. Later prototypes have been shown at the Geneva Motor Show in 2011 and 2012.

Specifications 
The company is responsible for the design of the coupe version's roof structure and gullwing doors (available as from 2014). The vehicle will feature an aluminium-hybrid body mounted onto a fully triangulated, jig welded roundtube spaceframe chassis to maximize strength and minimizing weight while still keeping production costs reasonable. Also featured are powerful, 6-piston (front) resp. 4-piston (rear) brakes manufactured by GM and a variable, power locking limited slip differential.

Total weight is said to be 1,020 kg in GT trim, and 1,045 kg in GTA trim, AC representatives say that the car can hit 100 km/h in approximately 3.7 seconds (GT trim) resp. 3.5 seconds (GTA trim).

References

External links
 AC Cars Website

Mk VI
Retro-style automobiles